This is a list of 109 species in Alabagrus, a genus of braconid wasps in the family Braconidae.

Alabagrus species

 Alabagrus albispina (Cameron, 1887) c g
 Alabagrus alixa Sharkey, 1988 c g
 Alabagrus arawak Sharkey, 1988 c g
 Alabagrus arua Sharkey, 1988 c g
 Alabagrus aymara Sharkey, 1988 c g
 Alabagrus botocudo Sharkey, 1988 c g
 Alabagrus caingang Sharkey, 1988 c g
 Alabagrus calibi Sharkey, 1988 c g
 Alabagrus caquetio Sharkey, 1988 c g
 Alabagrus cara Sharkey, 1988 c g
 Alabagrus carib Sharkey, 1988 c g
 Alabagrus caudatus (Szepligeti, 1904) c
 Alabagrus chimu Sharkey, 1988 c g
 Alabagrus coatlicue Sharkey, 1988 c g
 Alabagrus cocto Sharkey, 1988 c g
 Alabagrus combos Leathers & Sharkey, 2003 c g
 Alabagrus cora Sharkey, 1988 c g
 Alabagrus cuna Sharkey, 1988 c g
 Alabagrus derailersi Leathers & Sharkey, 2003 c g
 Alabagrus diegeli Sharkey, 1988 c g
 Alabagrus donnai Leathers & Sharkey, 2003 c g
 Alabagrus ekchuah Sharkey, 1988 c g
 Alabagrus elatoscutum Sharkey, 1988 c g
 Alabagrus englishi Leathers & Sharkey, 2003 c g
 Alabagrus erythromelas (Brulle, 1846) c
 Alabagrus esenbeckii (Spinola, 1840) c
 Alabagrus festivus (Enderlein, 1920) c g
 Alabagrus fuscistigma Enderlein, 1920 c g
 Alabagrus guayaki Sharkey, 1988 c g
 Alabagrus haenschi (Enderlein, 1920) c g
 Alabagrus imitatus (Cresson, 1873) c g
 Alabagrus intimapa Sharkey, 1988 c g
 Alabagrus ixtilton Sharkey, 1988 c g
 Alabagrus janzeni Sharkey, 1988 c g
 Alabagrus jatunqepi Sharkey, 1988 c g
 Alabagrus juchuy Sharkey, 1988 c g
 Alabagrus kagaba Sharkey, 1988 c g
 Alabagrus kiska Sharkey, 1988 c g
 Alabagrus laevis (Enderlein, 1920) c g
 Alabagrus latisoma Sharkey, 1988 c g
 Alabagrus latreillei (Spinola, 1840) c g
 Alabagrus leptosoma Sharkey, 1988 c g
 Alabagrus levipodeum Sharkey, 1988 c g
 Alabagrus llampu Sharkey, 1988 c g
 Alabagrus lokono Sharkey, 1988 c g
 Alabagrus maculipes (Cameron, 1887) c g
 Alabagrus marginatifrons (Muesebeck, 1927) c g
 Alabagrus masneri Sharkey, 1988 c g
 Alabagrus masoni Sharkey, 1988 c g
 Alabagrus mataco Sharkey, 1988 c g
 Alabagrus maue Sharkey, 1988 c g
 Alabagrus maya Sharkey, 1988 c g
 Alabagrus miqa Sharkey, 1988 c g
 Alabagrus misa Sharkey, 1988 c g
 Alabagrus mixcoatl Sharkey, 1988 c g
 Alabagrus mocovi Sharkey, 1988 c g
 Alabagrus mojos Sharkey, 1988 c g
 Alabagrus muisca Sharkey, 1988 c g
 Alabagrus nahuatl Sharkey, 1988 c g
 Alabagrus nicoya Sharkey, 1988 c g
 Alabagrus nigritulus (Szepligeti, 1902) c g
 Alabagrus nio Sharkey, 1988 c g
 Alabagrus olmec Sharkey, 1988 c g
 Alabagrus oyana Sharkey, 1988 c g
 Alabagrus pachamama Sharkey, 1988 c g
 Alabagrus paqo Sharkey, 1988 c g
 Alabagrus parunaupi Sharkey, 1988 c g
 Alabagrus parusimi Sharkey, 1988 c g
 Alabagrus paruyana Sharkey, 1988 c g
 Alabagrus parvifaciatus (Cameron, 1911) c g
 Alabagrus pecki Sharkey, 1988 c g
 Alabagrus pisipuka Sharkey, 1988 c g
 Alabagrus plaumanni Sharkey, 1988 c g
 Alabagrus porteri Sharkey, 1988 c g
 Alabagrus puri Sharkey, 1988 c g
 Alabagrus roibasi Sharkey, 1988 c g
 Alabagrus sanctus (Say, 1836) c g
 Alabagrus sarapiqui Leathers & Sharkey, 2003 c g
 Alabagrus semialbus (Szepligeti, 1902) c g
 Alabagrus shorteri Sharkey, 1988 c g
 Alabagrus sispacara Sharkey, 1988 c g
 Alabagrus sispalatreillei Sharkey, 1988 c g
 Alabagrus solox (Enderlein, 1920) c g
 Alabagrus stigma (Brulle, 1846) c b
 Alabagrus suni Sharkey, 1988 c g
 Alabagrus testaceus (Szepligeti, 1902) c g
 Alabagrus texanus (Cresson, 1872) c g b
 Alabagrus triangulifer (Enderlein, 1920) c g
 Alabagrus tricarinatus (Cameron, 1905) c g
 Alabagrus tripartitus (Brulle, 1846) c g
 Alabagrus tupinamba Sharkey, 1988 c g
 Alabagrus uchuk Sharkey, 1988 c g
 Alabagrus uchukqepi Sharkey, 1988 c g
 Alabagrus uru Sharkey, 1988 c g
 Alabagrus variegatus (Brulle, 1846) c g
 Alabagrus varipes (Cresson, 1865) c g
 Alabagrus varius (Enderlein, 1920) c g
 Alabagrus versicolor (Brèthes, 1909) c g
 Alabagrus voto Sharkey, 1988 c g
 Alabagrus wachapu Sharkey, 1988 c g
 Alabagrus waiwai Sharkey, 1988 c g
 Alabagrus waorani Sharkey, 1988 c g
 Alabagrus warrau Sharkey, 1988 c g
 Alabagrus watachupa Sharkey, 1988 c g
 Alabagrus watsoni Leathers & Sharkey, 2003 c g
 Alabagrus xipe Sharkey, 1988 c g
 Alabagrus xoloti Sharkey, 1988 c g
 Alabagrus yanamapa Sharkey, 1988 c g
 Alabagrus yaruro Sharkey, 1988 c g

Data sources: i = ITIS, c = Catalogue of Life, g = GBIF, b = Bugguide.net

References

Alabagrus